Utricularia uxoris is a small epiphytic carnivorous plant in the genus Utricularia that is endemic to Costa Rica. It is distinguished from all other members of section Orchidioides in having green glabrous flowers with a white spur and its small size. The species is only known from its type locality in Reserva Biológica El Copal, Cartago Province.

Utricularia uxoris is possibly just a form or variety of U. jamesoniana,  but Gómez-Laurito indicated in his original description of U. uxoris that it has shallow corolla lobe divisions, compared to the deeply dissected corolla lobes found on U. jamesoniana flowers.

See also 
 List of Utricularia species

References

Sources

 
 

Carnivorous plants of Central America
Epiphytes
Flora of Costa Rica
Plants described in 2005
uxoris